The Rights of Persons with Disabilities Act, 2016 is the disability legislation passed by the Indian Parliament to fulfill its obligation to the United Nations Convention on the Rights of Persons with Disabilities, which India ratified in 2007. The Act replaced the existing Persons With Disabilities (Equal Opportunities, Protection of Rights and Full Participation) Act, 1995.

Legislative history 
The Rights of Persons with Disabilities Bill, 2014 was introduced into the Parliament on 7 February 2014 and passed by the Lok Sabha on 14 December 2016. The Bill was passed by the Rajya Sabha on 16 December 2016 and received the President's assent on 27 December 2016. The Act become operational on 19 April 2017. The Central Government rules 2017 have been notified under Section 100 of the Act and have come into force with effect from 15 June 2017.

Case law 
Uttar Pradesh cabinet minister was the first one to be booked under this new legislation when disability activist Satendra Singh (doctor) filed case against him on publicly humiliating a disabled employee. The addition of thalassemia as a new disability under this new law allowed a Chhattisgarh girl with this disorder to get medical admission after Supreme Court's intervention.

References

External links 
 Text of legislation

Acts of the Parliament of India 2016
Disability in India
Disability law